Mélanie Couzy (born 19 February 1990) is a French sports shooter. She competed in the women's trap event at the 2020 Summer Olympics.

References

External links
 

1990 births
Living people
French female sport shooters
Olympic shooters of France
Shooters at the 2020 Summer Olympics
Sportspeople from Loir-et-Cher